is a 2014 Japanese erotic action film directed by Koichi Sakamoto and written by Takehiko Minato, based on the novel Aka × Pink by Kazuki Sakuraba and distributed by Kadokawa. It was released on 22 February 2014.

Story
Four girls take part in illegal underground fighting event "Girl's Blood" held at an abandoned school building in Roppongi every night. The girls have their own stories and quirks from their private lives. Satsuki (Yuria Haga) suffers from a gender identity disorder, Chinatsu (Asami Tada) ran away from an abusive husband, Miko (Ayame Misaki) is a S&M queen and Mayu (Rina Koike) has a Lolita face.

Cast
Yuria Haga as Satsuki  
Asami Tada as Chinatsu 
Ayame Misaki as Miko
Rina Koike as Mayu
Misaki Momose as Momomi
Hideo Sakaki as Ranmaru Ando

Reception
Patryk Czekaj, in a review on Twitch Film, called the film a "especially entertaining and laugh-inducing" guilty pleasure.

References

External links
 

2014 action films
2010s erotic films
Films directed by Koichi Sakamoto
Japanese action films
Kadokawa Daiei Studio films
Films based on Japanese novels
Japanese erotic films
2010s Japanese films